Shōzō Satō (佐藤 昌三, Satō Shōzō,  born May 18, 1933) is an artist, author, calligrapher, playwright, and a professor emeritus of the College of Art and Design at the University of Illinois at Urbana–Champaign. He is the founder and former director of Japan House, and a former artist-in-residence at the Krannert Center for the Performing Arts.

He is an internationally renowned master of Japanese traditional arts, such as Ikebana, Japanese Calligraphy, Sumi-e, Japanese Aesthetics, Japanese Traditional Dance, and Japanese Tea Ceremony. He is also a visionary theater director, most known for adapting Western classics into a traditional Japanese Kabuki style.

Biography 
Satō was born in Kobe, Japan on May 18th, 1933, and grew up in Kamakura. He obtained a degree in Fine Arts from Bunka Gakuen College in Tokyo, studied music at the Tokyo Seisen School, studied theatre at the Toho Academy of Performing Arts in Tokyo, and trained with kabuki artist Nakamura Kanzaburō XVII. He studied Japanese Tea Ceremony under Kishimoto Kōsen. He taught and performed in Japan until the early 60s. 

Satō first arrived at the University of Illinois in 1964 as a visiting artist. In 1968, he founded the Japanese Arts and Culture Program, where he taught classes in traditional Japanese arts, such as Calligraphy, Sumi-e, Ikebana, Kabuki, Tea Ceremony, and Japanese Aesthetics.

He is known for adapting traditional western theatre into Kabuki style productions. His adaptations include Macbeth, Medea, Othello, Faust, Achilles, Madame Butterfly and, The Mikado. His last academic production was a Kabuki adaptation of Othello, titled Iago's Plot (2017), at the University of Illinois, Urbana-Champaign, at the Krannert Center for the Performing Arts.

He is also a visiting professor at Northwestern University in Evanston, Illinois.

Satō is the author of The Art of Arranging Flowers: A Complete Guide to Japanese Ikebana, published in 1968 by Harry N. Abrams, Incorporated, New York, NY. The volume was printed and bound in Japan. With the assistance of Thomas A. Heenan, Satō is the author of The Art of Sumi-E: Appreciation, Techniques, and Application, published in 1984 by Kodansha International Limited, Tokyo, Japan. The volume was printed in Japan and distributed in the U.S. by Kodansha International/USA Limited through Harper & Row, Publishers, Incorporated, New York, NY.

Satō retired from teaching in 1992 and moved to Northern California where he established a Center for Japanese Art.

Satō officiated at the wedding of actors Nick Offerman and Megan Mullally. on September 20, 2003.

In 2016, Satō returned to Champaign, Illinois, where he continues to teach calligraphy, Sumi-e, and Zen philosophy.

Awards and Honors
In 2004, he was awarded the Japanese Order of the Sacred Treasure .

Bibliography

Books 
 1965: The Art of Arranging Flowers: A Complete Guide to Japanese Ikebana
 1984: The Art of Sumi-E: Appreciation, Techniques, and Application
 2004: Soul of Japan: Introducing Traditional Japanese Arts to New Generations
 2010: Sumi-e: The Art of Japanese Ink Painting
 2013: Ikebana: The Art of Arranging Flowers
 2014: Shodo: The Quiet Art of Japanese Zen Calligraphy, Learn the Wisdom of Zen Through Traditional Brush Painting
 2017: Tea Ceremony: Explore the unique Japanese tradition of sharing tea
 2017: Ikebana: Create beautiful flower arrangements with this traditional Japanese art
 2022: Chazen: Zen Wisdom for Jeans & a T-Shirt

Plays 
 1978: Kabuki Macbeth
 1981: Kabuki Madame Butterfly
 1982: Kabuki Medea
 1986: Kabuki Faust
 1988: Kabuki Othello
 1991: Achilles: A Kabuki Play
1996: Iago's Plot
1997: For Love, Reconstructed from Romeo and Juliet
2005: Kabuki Lady Macbeth

References

Kabuki playwrights
Living people
Recipients of the Order of the Sacred Treasure, 4th class
1933 births